Blind man's buff or blind man's bluff is a variant of tag in which the player who is "It" is blindfolded. The traditional name of the game is "blind man's buff", where the word buff is used in its older sense of a small push.

Gameplay
Blind man's buff is played in a spacious area, such as outdoors or in a large room, in which one player, designated as "It", is blindfolded and gropes around attempting to touch the other players without being able to see them, while the other players scatter and try to avoid the person who is "it", hiding in plain sight and sometimes teasing them to influence them to change direction.

When the "it" player catches someone, the caught player becomes "it" and the catcher flees from them.

Versions

There are several versions of the game:

 In one version, the first player tagged by It then becomes It, and another round of the game is played.
 In another version, whenever any player is tagged by It, that player is out of the game. The game proceeds until all players are out of the game, at which point another round of the game starts, with either the first player or the last player to be tagged becoming the next It player.
 In yet another version, It feels the face of the person tagged and attempts to identify the person, and only if the person is correctly identified does the person become It.
 In a unique Japanese version, young girls dress up in their kimono and the blind-folded girl must catch or touch the other girls both while blindfolded and at the same time carrying a full cup of tea.

History

A version of the game was played in Ancient Greece where it was called "copper mosquito."
The game is played by children in Bangladesh where it is known as Kanamachi meaning blind fly. One individual is blind-folded in order to catch or touch one of the others who run around repeating, "The blind flies are hovering fast! Catch whichever you can!" The game was played in the Tudor period, as there are references to its recreation by Henry VIII's courtiers.  It was also a popular parlor game in the Victorian era. The poet Robert Herrick mentions it, along with sundry related pastimes, in his 1624 poem "A New Yeares Gift Sent to Sir Simeon Steward":

That tells of Winters Tales and Mirth,
That Milk-Maids make about the hearth,
Of Christmas sports, the Wassell-boule,
That tost up, after Fox-i' th' hole:
Of Blind-man-buffe, and of the care
That young men have to shooe the Mare

It is also played in many areas in Asia including Afghanistan and all over Europe.

Similar games

A children's game similar to blind man's buff is Marco Polo. Marco Polo is usually played in a swimming pool; the player who is "it" shuts their eyes and calls out "Marco" to which the other players must reply "Polo", thus indicating their positions and making it easier for "it" to go in the right direction.

Another children's game similar to blind man's buff is Dead Man. The player who is "it" closes their eyes rather than wearing a blindfold.

See also
 I spy
 Hide-and-seek
 Marco Polo (game)
 Kagome Kagome

References 

Children's games
Tag variants
Hide-and-seek variants